Gary Longwell (born 30 July 1971 in Belfast) is an Irish international rugby player. His usual position is as a lock, or second row. He spent his entire career playing for Irish provincial side Ulster, making his debut aged 19 in 1991. He was part of the Heineken Cup-winning Ulster team of 1999 in the 21–6 victory over Colomiers at Lansdowne Road in Dublin. In 2015, he was inducted into the Newtownabbey Hall of Fame

Provincial career 
He made 152 caps for his provincial side Ulster, making his debut aged just 19 against English side Cornwall in 1991.  He also played an integral role in the Heineken Cup final victory winning Ulster team of 1999 in the 21–6 victory over Colomiers at Lansdowne Road in Dublin.

International career
Longwell made his debut for the Irish national team on 11 November 2000 in a Test against Japan in Dublin and went on to win 26 caps. He was a part of Ireland's squad at the 2003 Rugby World Cup in Australia. He was also the only Ireland try scorer in the 40-8 demolition by New Zealand in Auckland, 2002.

Post-playing career
In 2005, Longwell was appointed head of the Ulster Rugby academy.

References

External links
 Sporting Heroes bio
 ERC bio
 

1971 births
Irish rugby union players
Ireland international rugby union players
Ulster Rugby players
Queen's University RFC players
Ballymena R.F.C. players
Living people
Rugby union locks
Rugby union players from Belfast
Ulster Rugby non-playing staff